Robert Roche may refer to:
 Robert Roche (businessman), American entrepreneur and philanthropist
 Robert Roche (activist), Native American civil rights activist
 Robert Roche (minister), Church of Scotland minister
 Robert H. Roche, American farmer and politician